In Greek mythology, Cynortas  or Cynortes  (Ancient Greek: Κυνόρτας) or Cynortus was a king of Sparta.

Family 
Cynortas was the son of King Amyclas of Sparta and Queen Diomede, and thus brother to King Argalus, Hyacinthus, Laodamia (or Leanira), Hegesandre, Harpalus, Polyboea and in other versions, of Daphne. He was the father of Oebalus or of Perieres, who either succeeded to the throne.

Mythology 
After the death of his brother Argalus, Cynortes inherited the kingdom and eventually became the king of Sparta. His tomb was shown near Scias at Sparta.

See also
List of kings of Sparta

Notes

References 

 Apollodorus, The Library with an English Translation by Sir James George Frazer, F.B.A., F.R.S. in 2 Volumes, Cambridge, MA, Harvard University Press; London, William Heinemann Ltd. 1921. ISBN 0-674-99135-4. Online version at the Perseus Digital Library. Greek text available from the same website.
Parthenius, Love Romances translated by Sir Stephen Gaselee (1882-1943), S. Loeb Classical Library Volume 69. Cambridge, MA. Harvard University Press. 1916.  Online version at the Topos Text Project.
 Parthenius, Erotici Scriptores Graeci, Vol. 1. Rudolf Hercher. in aedibus B. G. Teubneri. Leipzig. 1858. Greek text available at the Perseus Digital Library.
 Pausanias, Description of Greece with an English Translation by W.H.S. Jones, Litt.D., and H.A. Ormerod, M.A., in 4 Volumes. Cambridge, MA, Harvard University Press; London, William Heinemann Ltd. 1918. . Online version at the Perseus Digital Library
Pausanias, Graeciae Descriptio. 3 vols. Leipzig, Teubner. 1903.  Greek text available at the Perseus Digital Library.

External links

Princes in Greek mythology
Mythological kings of Sparta
Kings in Greek mythology
Laconian characters in Greek mythology
Laconian mythology